The 1997 Durham mayoral election was held on November 4, 1997 to elect the mayor of Durham, North Carolina. It saw the election of Nick Tennyson.

Incumbent mayor Sylvia Kerckhoff did not seek reelection.

Results

Primary 
The date of the primary was October 7, 1997.

General election

References 

Durham
Mayoral elections in Durham, North Carolina
Durham